Coláiste na Coiribe is a Gaelscoil in Galway, Ireland. The school is administered by the Galway and Roscommon ETB. There are about 550 students enrolled, making it the world's largest all-Irish language education institution.

History
Coláiste na Coiribe was established in 1992 with six students. It was originally located on the Tuam Road in Galway City but relocated to Knocknacarra in October 2015.

Curriculum
The educational programme of the school consists of Junior Certificate, Transition Year, Leaving Certificate and the LCVP. Each student's academic progress is constantly monitored and evaluated. Written reports are sent home four times per academic year.

References

External links
Official website

1992 establishments in Ireland
Buildings and structures in Galway (city)
Educational institutions established in 1992
Education in Galway (city)
Irish-language schools and college
Secondary schools in County Galway